Microbryum is a genus of mosses belonging to the family Pottiaceae.

The genus was first described by Wilhelm Philippe Schimper.

The genus has cosmopolitan distribution.

Species:
 Microbryum davallianum Zander, 1993

References

Pottiaceae
Moss genera